Ctenucha signata is a moth of the family Erebidae. It is found in Venezuela.

References

signata
Moths described in 1926